Przeszkoda may refer to the following places:
Przeszkoda, Lubusz Voivodeship (west Poland)
Przeszkoda, Masovian Voivodeship (east-central Poland)
Przeszkoda, Podlaskie Voivodeship (north-east Poland)